Paroster is a genus of beetles in the family Dytiscidae, containing the following species:

 Paroster couragei Watts, 1978
 Paroster gibbi Watts, 1978
 Paroster insculptilis (Clark, 1862)
 Paroster michaelseni Régimbart, 1908
 Paroster niger Watts, 1978
 Paroster nigroadumbratus (Clark, 1862)
 Paroster pallescens Sharp, 1882
 Paroster sharpi Watts, 1978
 Paroster thapsinus (Guignot, 1955)
together with these (listed as valid by the Australian Faunal Directory):

 Paroster anophthalmus 
 Paroster arachnoides 
 Paroster baylyi 
 Paroster bulbus 
 Paroster byroensis 
 Paroster caecus 
Paroster copidotibiae 
 Paroster darlotensis 
 Paroster dingbatensis 
 Paroster eurypleuron 
 Paroster extraordinarius 
 Paroster fortisspina 
 Paroster hamoni 
 Paroster hinzeae 
 Paroster innouendyensis 
 Paroster killaraensis 
 Paroster macrocephalus 
 Paroster macrosturtensis 
 Paroster megamacrocephalus 
 PParoster mesosturtensis 
 Paroster microsturtensis 
 Paroster milgunensis 
 Paroster napperbyensis 
 Paroster newhavenensis 
 Paroster peelensis 
 Paroster pentameres 
 Paroster plutonicensis 
 Paroster septum 
 Paroster skaphites 
 Paroster stegastos 
 Paroster tetrameres  
 Paroster ursulae 
 Paroster verrucosus 
 Paroster wedgeensis

References

Dytiscidae genera